Glendale is a city in the San Fernando Valley and Verdugo Mountains regions of Los Angeles County, California, United States. At the 2020 U.S. Census the population was 196,543, up from 191,719 at the 2010 census, making it the fourth-largest city in Los Angeles County and the 24th-largest city in California.

Glendale lies in the Verdugo Mountains, and is a suburb in the Los Angeles metropolitan area. The city is bordered to the northwest by the Sun Valley and Tujunga neighborhoods of Los Angeles; to the northeast by La Cañada Flintridge and the unincorporated area of La Crescenta; to the west by Burbank and Griffith Park; to the east by Eagle Rock and Pasadena; to the south by the Atwater Village neighborhood of Los Angeles; and to the southeast by Glassell Park neighborhood of Los Angeles. The Golden State, Ventura, Glendale, and Foothill freeways run through the city.

History

Spanish rule
In 1798, José María Verdugo, a corporal in the Spanish army from Baja California, received the Rancho San Rafael from Governor Diego de Borica, formalizing his possession and use of land on which he had been grazing livestock and farming since 1784. Rancho San Rafael was a Spanish concession, of which 25 were made in California. Unlike the later Mexican land grants, the concessions were similar to grazing permits, with the title remaining with the Spanish crown.

Mexican rule
New Spain achieved its independence from the Spanish Empire in 1821, and from 1824, Rancho San Rafael existed within the new Mexican Republic.

1847 to present
Mexican rule ended during the Mexican–American War: Americans took control from the Californios after a series of battles, culminating with the signing of the Treaty of Cahuenga on January 13, 1847. With the cession of California to the United States following the Mexican–American War, the 1848 Treaty of Guadalupe Hidalgo provided that the land grants would be honored. As required by the Land Act of 1851, a claim was filed with the Public Land Commission in 1852, confirmed by the Commission in 1855, and the grant was patented to Julio and Catalina Verdugo in 1882.

In 1860, José María Verdugo's grandson Teodoro Verdugo built the Catalina Verdugo Adobe, which is the oldest building in Glendale. The property is the location of the Oak of Peace, where early Californio leaders including Pio Pico met in 1847 and decided to surrender to Lieutenant Colonel John C. Frémont.

Verdugo's descendants sold the ranch in various parcels, some of which are included in present-day Atwater Village, Eagle Rock, and Highland Park neighborhoods of Los Angeles. 

In 1883, soon after Atwater Village was settled, the Atwater Tract Office brought train service to the area. In 1884, residents gathered to form a townsite and chose the name "Glendale". It was bounded by First Street (now Lexington Drive) on the north, Fifth Street (now Harvard Street) on the south, Central Avenue on the west, and the Childs Tract on the east. Residents to the southwest formed "Tropico" in 1887.

An important civic booster of the era was Leslie Coombs Brand (1859–1925), who built an estate in 1904 called El Miradero, featuring an eye-catching mansion, the architecture of which combined characteristics of Spanish, Moorish, and Indian styles, copied from the East Indian Pavilion at the 1893 World's Columbian Exposition held in Chicago, which he visited. 

Brand partnered with Henry E. Huntington to bring the Pacific Electric Railway, or the "Red Cars", to the area. The Glendale–Burbank Line, which was operational from 1904 to 1955, ran from Downtown Los Angeles to Burbank via Glendale. The dual-track streetcars entered the Glendale city limit by crossing San Fernando Road, and the line continued northerly in the pavement of Brand Boulevard, crossing Los Feliz Boulevard, Chevy Chase Boulevard, Colorado Boulevard, Broadway and Lexington Drive. The main line continued north to Verdugo Wash where the line became a single track. At Arden Junction at Glenoaks Boulevard, the line branched. The old main line continued north in the pavement of Brand Boulevard to a terminus in North Glendale at Mountain Avenue. The Burbank Line diverged westerly as a single-track line on private way in the center of Glenoaks Boulevard, then continued westerly past Central, Pacific, Highland, western, and Alameda Avenues to a terminus in Burbank at Cypress Avenue. 

Brand loved to fly, and built a private airstrip in 1919 and hosted "fly-in" parties, providing a direct link to the soon-to-be-built nearby Grand Central Airport. The grounds of El Miradero are now city-owned Brand Park and the mansion is the Brand Library, according to the terms of his will. 

The Forest Lawn Cemetery opened in 1906 and was renamed Forest Lawn Memorial-Park in 1917. Pioneering endocrinologist and entrepreneur Henry R. Harrower opened his clinic in Glendale in 1920, which for many years was the largest business in the city. 

In 1922, the Atwater Tract Office was demolished, and construction began on the Glendale Transportation Center. 

The American Green Cross, an early conservation and tree preservation society, was formed in 1926 (it disbanded three years later and the current organization of that name is unrelated).

Grand Central Airport was the departure point for the first commercial west-to-east transcontinental flight flown by Charles Lindbergh.

Sundown town status 
Until as late as the 1960s, Glendale was a sundown town. Nonwhites were required to leave city limits by a certain time each day or risk arrest and possible violence. In the 1930s, Glendale and Burbank prevented the Civilian Conservation Corps from stationing African American workers in a local park, citing sundown town ordinances that both cities had adopted. In 1964, Glendale was selected by George Lincoln Rockwell to be the West Coast headquarters of the American Nazi Party. After a legal battle with the city of Glendale, the party moved their headquarters to El Monte in 1966.

The emergence of increasingly visible ethnic groups — including Armenians, Cubans and Filipinos and Koreans — changed the official discourse in Glendale. In 1972, C.E. Perkins, then city manager, encouraged the Rotary Club of Glendale to prepare itself as the city could no longer remain isolated in an increasingly diverse America.

Historic architecture

Glendale began its historic preservation program in 1977 with the designation of 28 properties as city landmarks.  In 1997, the program evolved with the establishment of the Glendale Register of Historic Resources. The register now has over 100 properties. In addition, 11 properties in Glendale are listed on the National Register of Historic Places. The city's most honored historic properties include the Catalina Verdugo Adobe, Brand Library & Art Center, Glendale Southern Pacific Railroad Depot, Grand Central Air Terminal, and Alex Theatre.

Geography

Glendale is located in the southeastern San Fernando Valley. Glendale is the fourth largest city within Los Angeles County. It is bordered to the north by the foothill communities of La Cañada Flintridge, La Crescenta, and Tujunga; to the south by the Atwater Village and Glassell Park communities incorporated by the city of Los Angeles; to the east by Pasadena and Eagle Rock (also incorporated within Los Angeles); and to the west by Griffith Park and the city of Burbank.

Geology
Several known earthquake faults criss-cross the Glendale area and adjacent mountains, as in much of Southern California. Among the more recognized faults are the Sierra Madre and Hollywood faults, situated in the city's northern and southwestern portions, respectively. Additionally, the Verdugo and Raymond faults intersect through the city's central and southeastern areas. The San Gabriel fault, meanwhile, is located northeast of the city. The closest portion of the San Andreas is actually  from Glendale. The last major quake along the southern San Andreas was recorded in 1857.

Most of the damage was in the northern San Fernando Valley, though 31 structures in Glendale suffered major damage and had to be demolished, plus numerous chimneys collapsed. The city suffered severe damage to a public parking structure and sections of the Glendale Galleria parking structures and exterior columns incurred damages.

Climate
Glendale has a Mediterranean climate (Köppen climate classification: Csa), with hot summers and mild winters with occasional rainfall. The warmest month is August and the coolest month is January.

The hills and mountains of northern Glendale very rarely have snow, owing to its warmer temperatures during the winter. It may only occur about every five to ten years. The last time it snowed was February 26, 2011, in which snow accumulation of approximately  occurred and sleet was present. Frost sometimes occurs at night from late November to early March. Heavy rains and thunderstorms are also common during the winter. The spring brings pleasant weather, with very little rain. Summer is usually very dry, but thunderstorms can come from Arizona, bringing high humidity into the area. Fall brings nice weather, but can be gusty due to the Santa Ana winds, blowing in once or twice a year from October to December. Thunderstorms occur very rarely and they are accompanied by gusty winds and hail.

Demographics

2010

The 2010 United States Census reported that Glendale had a population of 191,719. According to the Southern California Association of Government's 2016 Demographic and Growth Forecast, the population of Glendale is expected to reach about 214,000 by 2040, an increase of about 11 percent from 2012. The racial makeup of Glendale was 71.1% (136,226) White, 1.3% Black (2,573), 0.3% (531) Native American, 16.4% (31,434) Asian (6.9% Filipino, 5.4% Korean, 1.3% Chinese), 0.1% (122) Pacific Islander, 6.3% (12,146) from other races, and 4.5% (8,687) from two or more races. Hispanics or Latino residents  of any race made up 17.4% of the population ( 33,414). Non-Hispanic Whites were 61.5% of the population.

The census reported that 190,290 people (99.3% of the population) lived in households, 223 (0.1%) lived in noninstitutionalized group quarters, and 1,206 (0.6%) were institutionalized.
Of the 72,269 households, 21,792 (30.2%) had children under the age of 18 living in them, 37,486 (51.9%) were opposite-sex married couples living together, 8,908 (12.3%) had a female householder with no husband present, 3,693 (5.1%) had a male householder with no wife present, 2,359 (3.3%) were unmarried opposite-sex partnerships, and 605 (0.8%) were same-sex married couples or partnerships. About 18,000 households (24.9%) were made up of individuals, and 7,077 (9.8%) had someone living alone who was 65 years of age or older. The average household size was 2.63. The 50,087 families (69.3% of all households) had an average family size of 3.19.

In the city, the population was distributed as 35,732 (18.6%) under the age of 18, 16,609 (8.7%) aged 18 to 24, 54,518 (28.4%) aged 25 to 44, 54,942 (28.7%) aged 45 to 64, and 29,918 (15.6%) who were 65 years of age or older. The median age was 41.0 years. For every 100 females, there were 91.1 males. For every 100 females age 18 and over, there were 87.9 males.

The 76,269 housing units averaged 2,493.8 per square mile (962.8/km), of which 27,535 (38.1%) were owner-occupied, and 44,734 (61.9%) were occupied by renters. The homeowner vacancy rate was 1.3%; the rental vacancy rate was 5.5%; 76,769 people (40.0% of the population) lived in owner-occupied housing units and 113,521 people (59.2%) lived in rental housing units.

During 20092013, Glendale had a median household income of $53,020, with 14.2% of the population living below the federal poverty line.

2000

As of the census of 2000, there were 194,973 people, 71,805 households, and 49,617 families residing in the city. The population density was 6,362.2 inhabitants per square mile (2,456.1/km). There were 73,713 housing units averaged 2,405.3 per square mile (928.6/km). The racial makeup of the city was 63.6% White, 1.6% Black, 0.3% Native American, 16.1% Asian American, 0.1% Pacific Islander, 8.6% from other races, and 10.1% from two or more races. About 19.7% of the population was Hispanic or Latino of any race.

Of the 71,805 households, 32.9% had children under the age of 18 living with them, 52.3% were married couples living together, 11.8% had a female householder with no husband present, and 30.9% were not families; 25.7% of all households were made up of individuals, and 8.7% had someone living alone who was 65 years of age or older. The average household size was 2.68 and the average family size was 3.27.

In the city, the population was distributed as 22.4% under the age of 18, 8.4% from 18 to 24, 32.2% from 25 to 44, 23.1% from 45 to 64, and 13.9% who were 65 years of age or older. The median age was 38 years. For every 100 females, there were 91.3 males. For every 100 females age 18 and over, there were 88.0 males.

The median income for a household in the city was $41,805, and for a family was $47,633. Males had a median income of $39,709 versus $33,815 for females. The per capita income for the city was $22,227. About 13.6% of families and 15.5% of the population were below the poverty line, including 20.7% of those under age 18 and 11.9% of those age 65 or over.

In June 2000, Erin Texeira of the Los Angeles Times stated that according to data from the US Census and the City of Glendale, the populations were about 30% Armenians, 25% other White, 25% Latino and Hispanic, and 16% Asian.

Armenian population

Glendale has one of the largest communities of Armenian descent in the United States.

Armenian families have lived in the city since the 1920s, but the surge in immigration escalated in the 1970s. Armenian Americans are well integrated into the city, with many businesses, several Armenian schools, and ethnic/cultural organizations serving this ethnic group.
Most of the Armenians in Glendale arrived in the past two decades. The city of Glendale is home to one of the largest Armenian communities outside of Armenia.

Beginning in the late 1980s, with assistance from family and friends already there, Armenians from the former Soviet Union began arriving. In the Glendale Unified School District, by 1988, along with students from the Middle East, they had become the largest ethnic group in the public schools, now having a larger number than Latinos. 

A new headquarters of the Armenian National Committee of America-Western Region opened in 1994. By 1996, longtime Anglo residents, largely fueled by anti-Armenian sentiment, decried the increased density in South Glendale. By 1999, about 25% of the population spoke Armenian and there were many Armenian businesses. 

According to the United States 2000 Census, Glendale is home to 65,343 Armenian Americans (making up 34.1% of the total population), increasing from 1990 when there were 31,402 ArmenianAmericans in the city. As of 2005, one-third of Los Angeles' estimated 153,000 Armenians (or 51,000, around a quarter of Glendale's 205,000 residents) lived in Glendale. At that time, Armenians held a majority on the Glendale city council, and it had done so since that year. By 2005 the Armenian population was 40% of the total population.

In 2014, a Glendale Police Department spokesperson, stated, "In five to eight years, the [Armenian] community went from a few thousand to about 40,000." Levon Marashlian, an instructor of Armenian history at Glendale College, stated that in the early 1990s Glendale's Armenian community became the largest in the Los Angeles metropolitan area, surpassing the Armenian community of Hollywood. Alice Petrossian, the GUSD director of intercultural education, stated that Burbank lies within the middle of other Armenian communities, so it attracted Armenians. There are also a great number of Armenian immigrants from Iran who, due to the religious restrictions and lifestyle limitations of the Islamic government, immigrated to the US, many to Glendale since it was where their relatives resided.

As of March 2018, four of the five members of Glendale's city council are of Armenian descent: Mayor Vartan Gharapetian and councilmembers Zareh Sinanyan (mayor from 2014 to 2015), Ara Najarian (mayor from 2007 to 2008, 2010 to 2011, and 2015 to 2016), and Vrej Agajanian. Former Armenian American mayors of Glendale include Larry Zarian, Bob Yousefian, and Rafi Manoukian.

Singer Serj Tankian and bassist Shavo Odadjian, members of the Armenian American rock band System of a Down, were based in Glendale at the time of formation.

The Cathedral of Saint Gregory the Illuminator, which is the seat of North American diocese of the Armenian Catholic Church, is located in Glendale. The Bishop of the Diocese, Rt. Rev. Mikaël Antoine Mouradian, is also resident in Glendale.

Other ethnic groups

The Mexican American community was established in Glendale by the 1960s. The late 1980s and the early 1990s also saw increases in Mexican American population as Glendale offers higher quality education along a safer suburban environment away from the city.

Several Korean cities have sought to create business and cultural relationships with Glendale. Central Park has the only West Coast monument to Korean comfort women of World War II.

, Filipino Americans were the third largest minority group in Glendale, making up seven percent of the city's total population, overtaking Korean Americans.
In 2022, the Filipino American Friendship Monument was unveiled in Central Park.

After the Iranian Revolution, many Persians migrated to the cities seeking a suburban city with lower crime and quality education.

Crime and public safety

In 1977 and 1978, 10 murdered women were found in and around Glendale in what became known as the case of the Hillside Strangler. The murders were the work of Kenneth Bianchi and Angelo Buono, the latter of whom resided at 703 East Colorado Street, where most of the murders took place.

In 2014, Glendale was named the ninth-safest city in America in a report published by 24/7 Wall Street based on violent crime rates in cities with more than 100,000 people. Also in 2014, real estate company Movoto used FBI data crime data from 2013 to conduct a study of 100 U.S. cities with populations between 126,047 and 210,309 residents and concluded that Glendale was the safest mid-sized city in America.

Economy

, the top employers in the city are (with number of employees):

Industry and development

Grand Central Airport was a municipal airport developed from 1923 which became the largest employer in Glendale for many years, and contributed to the development of aviation in the United States in many important ways. The main terminal building still stands and includes both Art Deco and Spanish-style architectural elements. The facility was the first official terminal for the Los Angeles area, as well as the departure point for the first commercial west-to-east transcontinental flight flown by Charles Lindbergh. During World War II, the Grand Central Air Terminal building was camouflaged to protect it from enemy targeting. It was closed down in 1959, and made way for the Grand Central Business Centre, an industrial park.

Forest Lawn Memorial Park started in Tropico (later annexed to Glendale) in 1906 and is famous for its art collection and the burial of many celebrities, as well as for the 1933 opening of the first funeral home on cemetery grounds anywhere in the United States. The Bob's Big Boy chain of hamburger restaurants started in Glendale on East Colorado in August 1936, and the Baskin-Robbins "31 Flavors" chain of ice cream parlors started in Adams Square in 1945.
The Glendale Public Library on Harvard Street houses its "Special Collections" department which contains original documents and records on much of the history of Glendale. It also contains one of the largest collections of books on cats in the world, over 20,000 volumes. It was donated to the library in the 1950s by the Jewel City Cat Fanciers Club.

The city experienced significant development in the 1970s, with the completion of the Glendale Freeway (Highway 2) and the Ventura Freeway (Highway 134). This included redevelopment of Brand Boulevard, renovation of the 1925 Alex Theatre, and construction of the Glendale Galleria shopping mall which opened in 1976, and was further expanded in 1982.

Several large companies have offices in Glendale including the U.S. headquarters of International House of Pancakes. The Los Angeles regional office of California's State Compensation Insurance Fund is in Glendale. Americas United Bank was founded in Glendale in 2006 and is still headquartered there. In August 2013, Avery Dennison Corp., a label maker for major brands, announced plans to move its headquarters from Pasadena to Glendale. Avery employs about 26,000 people. The U.S. headquarters of the Swiss foods multinational Nestlé plans to move out by 2018.

Glendale, along with Burbank, has served as a major production center for the U.S. entertainment industry and the U.S. animation industry in particular for several decades, because the Walt Disney Company outgrew its Burbank studio lot in the early 1960s, and started expanding into the closest business park available, which happened to be Glendale's Grand Central Business Centre about two miles east. First came the headquarters for Imagineering, followed in the 1980s by other divisions and offices. Today, Disney's Grand Central Creative Campus (known as GC3 for short) is home to Consumer Products, Disney Interactive, the Muppets Studio, and Marvel Animation Studios. From 1985 to 1995, Walt Disney Animation Studios (then known as Walt Disney Feature Animation) was headquartered in the Grand Central Business Centre, meaning that most of the films of the Disney Renaissance era were actually developed in Glendale. DisneyToon Studios, a division of WDAS, is still located in the Grand Central Business Centre near GC3, along with the Animation Research Library, Disney Animation's archive. Disney-owned KABC-TV is located on Circle 7 Drive to the south of GC3.

In 1994, Steven Spielberg, Jeffrey Katzenberg, and David Geffen formed DreamWorks SKG, a diversified entertainment company. DreamWorks Animation remains located in the city's Grand Central Business Centre on land formerly occupied by a helicopter landing base next to the old airfield (and next to KABC-TV). Thus, many American animators who worked on feature films in the 1990s and 2000s have spent large portions of their careers in Glendale working for Disney or DreamWorks.

In 2005, construction began near the Galleria of developer Rick Caruso's "Americana at Brand", a  outdoor shopping and residential community. Caruso had previously designed and built the Grove at Farmers Market. The new Glendale development was opened to the public on May 2, 2008, and features 75 shops and restaurants, 238 apartments, 100 condominiums, and a Pacific Theatres 18-plex Cinema which seats 3,000 people.

Shopping
The downtown Glendale Galleria is anchored by Macy's, Target, J. C. Penney, and Bloomingdales, and the Americana at Brand, an outdoor mall which includes stores such as Tiffany & Co., H&M, Armani Exchange, True Religion, and Urban Outfitters. The Americana at Brand is home to a Nordstrom, which was previously located inside the Glendale Galleria. Another shopping area is the Glendale Fashion Center, which is anchored by Ross, TJ Maxx, Nordstrom Rack, Staples, and Petco.

Arts and culture

Performing arts
The Alex Theatre opened in 1925 as the Alexander Theatre. Currently, the theatre is a performing arts center featuring live performances and film screenings.

Museums and galleries
In 2016, the Museum of Neon Art moved to Glendale. MONA exhibits historical neon signs and works by contemporary artists using neon. The City of Glendale committed to funding the museum’s new site and construction, as part of a plan to develop its downtown.

Parks and recreation
The city has nearly 50 public parks, from Deukmejian Wilderness Park in the north to Cerritos Park in the south.

Government

Local government

According to the city's most recent comprehensive annual financial report, the city's various funds had $576 million in revenues, $543 million in expenditures, $2,090 million in total assets, $481 million in total liabilities, and $460 million in cash and investments.
Glendale elects its City Council members at large, to a four-year term. Elections are held on a Tuesday after the first Monday in April of odd-numbered years along with the Glendale Unified School District Board of Education and the Glendale Community College District Board of Trustees.

The current mayor and council members are:
 Mayor: Ardy Kassakhian
 Council Members: Elen Asatryan, Ara Najarian, Paula Devine, and Daniel Brotman

List of mayors 
The City Council selects one member to serve as Mayor for a one-year term. This is a list of Glendale mayors by year.
 April 1957 – April 1959: Zelma Bogue (first female mayor)
 April 1986 – April 1987: Larry Zarian
 April 1990 – April 1991: Larry Zarian
 April 1993 – April 1994: Larry Zarian
 April 1994  – April 1995: Eileen Givens
 April 1997 – April 1998: Larry Zarian
 April 1998 – April 1999: Eileen Givens
 April 2004 – April 2005: Bob Yousefian
 April 2005 – April 2006: Rafi Manoukian
 April 2007 – April 2008: Ara Najarian
 April 2008 – April 2009: John Drayman 
 April 2009 – April 2010: Frank Quintero
 April 2010 – April 2011: Ara Najarian
 April 2011 – April 2012: Laura Friedman
 April 2012 – April 2013: Frank Quintero
 April 2013 – April 2014: Dave Weaver
 April 2014 – April 2015: Zareh Sinanyan
 April 2015 – April 2016: Ara Najarian
 April 2016 – April 2017: Paula Devine
 April 2017 – April 2018: Vartan Gharpetian 
 April 2018 – April 2019: Zareh Sinanyan
 April 2019 – April 2020: Ara Najarian
 April 2020 – April 2021: Vrej Agajanian
 April 2021 – April 2022: Paula Devine
 April 2022 – present: Ardy Kassakhian

County representation
The Los Angeles County Department of Health Services operates the Glendale Health Center in Glendale.

The Los Angeles County Department of Public Social Services operates the Glendale DPSS welfare office on San Fernando Road.

The Los Angeles County Department of Parks and Recreation operates Crescenta Valley park in North Glendale

The Los Angeles County Department of Workforce Services, Aging and Community Services operates an undisclosed Adult Protective Services office in Glendale

In the Los Angeles County Board of Supervisors, Glendale is in the Fifth District, represented by Kathryn Barger.

State and federal representation

Education

The Glendale Unified School District operates the public schools in Glendale. The GUSD high schools include Glendale High School, Herbert Hoover High School, Clark Magnet High School, Crescenta Valley High School located in La Crescenta and Allan F. Daily High School. A number of private schools also operate in Glendale, including Chamlian Armenian School, Holy Family High School, Salem Lutheran School, and Glendale Adventist Academy. Glendale is also home to Glendale Community College.
Middle schools are Roosevelt Middle School, Toll Middle School, Rosemont Middle School, and Wilson Middle School.

Media
Glendale community news is covered by the Glendale News-Press, which was founded in 1905.

KABC-TV, an ABC owned-and-operated television station serving the Los Angeles metropolitan area and the rest of the Greater Los Angeles area, has maintained its studios and offices in Glendale since December 2000.

Infrastructure

Law enforcement
Glendale maintains its own police department (GPD) and is lead by Police Chief Manny Cid. The Department operates from a main station in downtown Glendale, a downtown substation in the Glendale Galleria, and the Montrose substation in Verdugo City. The Glendale Police Department is a full-service organization, with nearly 400 staff members. The Department offers a full scope of services, including Patrol, Traffic Enforcement, Investigations, Crime Lab, a Custody Facility, Air Support, Motors, SWAT, Drones, Bike Patrol, Vice Narcotics, and Federal Task Force Intelligence.

Fire department
Fire protection is provided by the Glendale Fire Department (GFD). The GFD is an all-risk, career fire protection agency, responding to about 17,000 emergency and nonemergency calls for service annually. The GFD consists of nine strategically located fire stations, with mutual aid provided by the Los Angeles County Fire Department, Los Angeles City Fire Department, Burbank Fire Department, and Pasadena Fire Department. The department maintains a "Class 1" ISO rating as part of certification through the Public Protection Classification Program.

Verdugo Fire Communications Center
The Verdugo FCC was established on August 1, 1979, between the cities of Burbank, Glendale, and Pasadena as a way to consolidate fire dispatching and telecommunications between the departments. Presently, Verdugo provides services to all 13 fire departments in the California OES "Area C" mutual aid plan, making them a regional dispatch center.

The center is stationed on the third floor of Glendale Fire Department's headquarters (Fire Station 21) and handles roughly 72,000 calls for service annually. The fire chiefs from Burbank, Glendale and Pasadena oversee the center under a joint powers authority. These cities contract services from the center: Bob Hope Airport, Warner Brothers, Disney Studios, South Pasadena, San Marino, San Gabriel, Arcadia, Monrovia, Sierra Madre, Montebello, Alhambra, Vernon, and Monterey Park.

Transportation

Public transportation
Bus services
LADOT, Metro Local, Metro Rapid, and Glendale Beeline all have buses that run in the city. Glendale Transportation Center provides connections to Greyhound buses.

The North Hollywood–Pasadena Transit Line is a proposed  bus rapid transit line. It is planned to operate between Pasadena City College and the North Hollywood station, where it will connect with the Metro B Line and the Metro G Line. The line is planned to connect downtown Burbank to Glendale via Glenoaks Boulevard before heading south on Central Avenue and then continuing east on Broadway. The line is expected to open in 2024. The project is part of Metro's Twenty-eight by '28 initiative.

A 2021 Metro staff report for the Metro Board's Planning and Programming Committee has recommended corridors where the transportation agency could pursue new bus rapid transit lines, including one between downtown Glendale and East Los Angeles College, a  corridor passing through Los Feliz, Silver Lake, and Echo Park.

Train services
Metrolink's Antelope Valley Line and Ventura County Line stop at the Glendale Transportation Center.

Since 2016, Metro and Eco-Rapid Transit have been studying the feasibility of adding more frequent service and infill stations along the corridor. Also studied has been the creation of a light rail line along the Burbank-Glendale-Union Station corridor, potentially allowing trains to leave the existing right-of-way to travel through the commercial core of Glendale.

Streetcar
Using a grant from the Southern California Association of Governments, the City of Glendale is now in the midst of a feasibility study for a streetcar project.

Airports
The closest airport that serves Glendale is the Hollywood Burbank Airport. The airport is owned by the Burbank–Glendale–Pasadena Airport Authority, a joint powers agreement between the cities of Burbank, Glendale, and Pasadena.

Freeways and highways
Glendale is served by four freeways: the Glendale Freeway (State Route 2), the Ventura Freeway (State Route 134), the Foothill Freeway (Interstate 210) and the Golden State Freeway (Interstate 5)

Major surface streets in the city include: Brand Boulevard, Broadway, Canada Boulevard, Central Avenue, Chevy Chase Drive, Colorado Boulevard, Foothill Boulevard, Glendale Avenue, Glenoaks Boulevard, Grandview Avenue, La Crescenta Avenue, Honolulu Avenue, Pennsylvania Avenue, Riverside Drive, Victory Boulevard, Pacific Avenue, Sonora Avenue, Western Avenue, San Fernando Road, Verdugo Road/Boulevard, Mountain Street, and Ocean View Boulevard.

Notable people

 Tatev Abrahamyan, chess player
 Allisyn Ashley Arm, actress, filmmaker
 Dan Avidan, vocalist in Ninja Sex Party and Starbomb, co-host of webseries Game Grumps
 Chet Baker, jazz musician
 Zoe Barnett, actress
 Kimberly Beck, actress
 Captain Beefheart, musician
 Dawn Bender, actress
 Christian Bergman, baseball pitcher
 Elvin Bishop, musician
 Aloe Blacc, musician
 David Brin, author
 Clara Bryant, actress
 Angelo Buono, serial killer
 Julia Butters, child actress
 Lucille Carroll, actress, MGM studio executive
 Armen Chakmakian, musician and composer
 Migdia Chinea, filmmaker
 John Cho, actor
 Claudia Christian, actress
 Ray Combs (1956–1996), former Family Feud host
 Doug Davidson, soap opera actor
 Bette Davis, actress
 John Debney, Academy Award-nominated composer
 Emilio Delgado, actor, Luis on Sesame Street
 Doug Dohring, CEO of Neopets
 Nicole Eggert, actress
 Erika Eleniak, model and actress
 Douglas Emerson, actor
 Robert Englund, actor, Nightmare on Elm Street
 Yvonne Lime Fedderson, actress, third wife of producer Don Fedderson
 Pat Flaherty, auto racing driver, winner of 1956 Indianapolis 500
 Doug Forrester, businessman and politician from New Jersey
 Edward Furlong, actor
 Beverly Garland, actress and hotel owner
 Daryl Gates, former LAPD police chief
 Go Betty Go, rock star
 Scott Gorham, musician
 Woody Guthrie, musician
 Joe Hahn, musician
 Peter D. Hannaford, political consultant and author associated with Ronald Reagan
 Arin Hanson, animator, vocalist of Starbomb, co-host of the webseries Game Grumps
 Thomas B. Hayward, United States admiral
 Tim Heidecker, comedian and musician
 Pamela Hensley, actress
 Taraji P. Henson, Academy Award–nominated actress
 Babe Herman, MLB right fielder
 Hardcore Holly, professional wrestler
 Chris Holmes, lead guitarist, W.A.S.P.
 John Holmes, pornographic actor
 Ashlyne Huff, musician
 Lux Interior and Poison Ivy, musicians, The Cramps
 Kathy Ireland, model and actress
 Jay-R, actor, TV host
 Nicole Jung, KPop artist
 Maren Jensen, actress
 Ed King, guitarist, Strawberry Alarm Clock & Lynyrd Skynyrd
 Robert Knapp, actor
 Don Knotts, Emmy-winning actor, lived in Glendale
 Nathan Kress, actor
 Greg Kriesel, bassist, The Offspring
 Shia LaBeouf, actor
 Jonna Lee, actress
 Robert B. Lewis, thoroughbred owner
 Mike Lieberthal, MLB All-Star catcher
 Yvonne Lime, actress
 Eric Lloyd, actor
 Mario Lopez, TV personality
 Katherine "Scottie" MacGregor, actress
 Benji Madden, lead guitarist, Good Charlotte
 Joel Madden, lead vocalist, Good Charlotte
 Daron Malakian, lead guitarist, System of a Down
 Rafi Manoukian, politician
 Vanes Martirosyan, boxer
 Tim Matheson, actor
 Rex Mays, champion race driver
 Mike Mazurki, actor and professional wrestler
 Brandon McCarthy, former pitcher for Los Angeles Dodgers
 Doug McClure, actor
 Eva Mendes, actress
 Don Milan, NFL player
 Terry Moore, actress
 Jim E. Mora, football coach
 Dennis Muren, special effects artist
 Clarence Nash, original voice of Donald Duck
 Taylor Negron, actor, comedian
 Ross O'Donovan, animator and YouTube personality
 Florence Oberle, actress
 Ken Osmond, actor from Leave It to Beaver
 Kelly Packard, actress
 Melissa Pastore, pastor
 Paul Petersen, actor from The Donna Reed Show
 Sam Phillips, musician
 Jamie Pineda, front woman of pop music project Sweetbox
 Al Pollard, NFL player and announcer
 Donald Prothero, paleontologist and author
 Scott Radinsky, MLB pitcher
 Ronnie Radke, vocalist, Falling In Reverse
 James Rallison, YouTuber known as TheOdd1sOut
 Frederick Emil Resche, U.S. Army brigadier general
 Archie Reynolds, MLB player
 Michael Richards, actor from Seinfeld
 Nicole Richie, fashion designer, TV personality
 Debra Jo Rupp, actress
 Devin Sarno, composer
 Maureen Kennedy Salaman, proponent of alternative medicine and author
 Steven L. Sears, writer and producer
 T. Sean Shannon, SNL comedy writer
 Bob Siebenberg, drummer of Supertramp
 Stirling Silliphant, screenwriter, producer
 Rick Springfield, musician
 Mary Kay Stearns, actress
 Casey Stengel, MLB player and Hall of Fame manager for New York Yankees
 Carl Steven, former child actor
 Joseph Stroud, poet and educator
 Gary Sutherland, MLB player
 Gloria Talbott, actress
 Diana Taurasi, WNBA player, Olympian
 Vic Tayback, actor, star of 1970s CBS sitcom Alice
 Jayceon Terrell Taylor, rapper, musician known professionally as The Game
 Michael Tonkin, MLB pitcher
 Ann Tyrrell, actress
 Ron Underwood, director
 Lupe Vélez, actress
 Shawna Waldron, actress
 Paul Walker, actor
 Gordon Waller, singer with Peter and Gordon
 John Wayne, iconic film actor, attended Glendale High School
 Tanya Falan Welk, singer
 Lorin Whitney, organist and recording artist
 Dale Wood, organist and composer
 Gregg Zaun, MLB catcher

Sister cities
Glendale's sister cities are:

 Martuni, Artsakh
 Gyumri, Armenia
 Kapan, Armenia  
 Santiago, Dominican Republic
 Higashiōsaka, Japan
 Rosarito Beach, Mexico
 Tlaquepaque, Mexico
 Boeun, South Korea
 Gimpo, South Korea
 Goseong, South Korea

See also

 List of cities in California
 Largest cities in Southern California
 M.V. Hartranft, early 20th-century land developer in Glendale
 Casa Adobe De San Rafael California Historic Landmark in Glendale

References

External links

 
 Glendale Chamber of Commerce

 
Cities in Los Angeles County, California
Communities in the San Fernando Valley
Incorporated cities and towns in California
Crescenta Valley
San Rafael Hills
Verdugo Mountains
Ethnic enclaves in the United States
Armenian-American culture in California
Armenian diaspora communities in the United States
Populated places established in 1906
1906 establishments in California
Sundown towns in California